Geography is the study of Earth and its features, inhabitants, and phenomena.

Geography may also refer to:

 Geography (Front 242 album)
 Geography (Tom Misch album)
"Geography", a song by Macintosh Plus from Floral Shoppe
 Geography, a lost 3-volume work by Eratosthenes
 Geography (Ptolemy), Ptolemy's main work besides the Almagest
 Geography (Strabo), Strabo's 17-volume geographic encyclopedia
 Geography (journal), published by the Geographical Association
 Geography (game), a word chain game played on cities

See also
Outline of geography
Geographical (magazine)
Geographer, one who practices geography
Geology, the study of rocks and minerals
Geometry (disambiguation)